Kiili Parish is a rural municipality in Harju County, north-western Estonia. It is located south of Estonia's capital, Tallinn. The population of Kiili Parish is 6,165 (as of 2022) and the area 100.4 km².

The administrative centre of Kiili Parish is Kiili borough, with a population of 1,492 (as of 2015). There are also 2 small boroughs: Kangru and Luige; and 13 villages in the parish: Arusta, Kurevere, Lähtse, Metsanurga, Mõisaküla, Nabala, Paekna, Piissoo, Sausti, Sookaera, Sõgula, Sõmeru, Vaela.

Religion

References

External links
 Official website (available only in Estonian)

 
Municipalities of Estonia